Alberto Rubio (born 6 September 1960) is a Spanish judoka. He competed in the men's half-heavyweight event at the 1984 Summer Olympics.

References

1960 births
Living people
Spanish male judoka
Olympic judoka of Spain
Judoka at the 1984 Summer Olympics
Place of birth missing (living people)
20th-century Spanish people